Way of the Warrior may refer to:

 Bushidō ("the way of the warrior"), the way of the samurai life, loosely analogous to the concept of chivalry
 The Way of the Warrior (documentary series), an eight-part 1983 BBC documentary series about Asian martial arts
 "The Way of the Warrior" (Star Trek: Deep Space Nine), a feature-length episode of the television series Star Trek: Deep Space Nine
 Way of the Warrior (video game), a fighting game released in 1994 for the 32-bit 3DO
 Young Samurai: The Way of the Warrior, a children's historical novel by Chris Bradford
 The Way of the Warrior, a challenge from the 2002 Scottish television series Raven

See also
Path of the Warrior (disambiguation)